The Australian Interstate Teams Matches is a mixed gender amateur team golf competition between the states of Australia. Planned in 2020, it was not held until 2022 because of the COVID-19 pandemic. It replaced the earlier separate men's and women's events which were last held in 2019.

Victoria won the 2022 event, beating South Australia in the final at Sorrento Golf Club.

Format
The event is contested by the six states of Australia. The format is a round-robin tournament, each team playing the other five teams, after which the top two teams play a final.

Each team consists of eight players, four men and four women. There are eight singles in each match, men playing men and women playing women, all contests being over 18 holes. Extra holes are not played. Final positions after the round-robin are decided firstly by the number of team points. Each team get half a point in a tied team match. Where teams are level on team points, the order is decided on individual matches won. The leading two teams after the round-robin contest a final, to determine the winner of the event.

Results

RR– Team's score in the round-robin stage. Positions were determined by the number of team points and where that is equal by the number of individual match points.

Appearances
The following players competed in 2022:
New South Wales: Kelsey Bennett, Harry Bolton, Harrison Crowe, Chris Fan, Belinda Ji, Brielle Mapanao, Hayley McNeill, Jye Pickin
Queensland: Justice Bosio, Quinnton Croker, Tyler Duncan, Rhianna Lewis, Blaike Perkins, Hannah Reeves, Sam Slater, Sarah Wilson
South Australia: Jack Buchanan, Billy Cawthorne, Raegan Denton, Kyle Hayter, Matilda Miels, Charlie Nobbs, Caitlin Peirce, Amelia Whinney
Tasmania: Jorjah Bailey, Joey Bower, Ronan Filgate, Hunter Gillard, Sarah Johnstone, Hallie Meaburn, Mark Schulze, Mackenzie Wilson
Victoria: Phoenix Campbell, Amelia Harris, Andre Lautee, Keeley Marx, Kono Matsumoto, Molly McLean, Jasper Stubbs, Toby Walker
Western Australia: Celine Chen, Sheridan Clancy, Connor Fewkes, Joshua Greer, Hayden Hopewell, Connor McKinney, Amie Phobubpa, Kirsten Rudgeley

References

Team golf tournaments
Amateur golf tournaments in Australia
Recurring sporting events established in 2020
2020 establishments in Australia